Øyvind Vågnes (born 1972) is a Norwegian novelist, magazine editor and researcher.

Vågnes was born in Brattvåg. He made his literary debut in 2003 with the novel Ingen skal sove i natt. He was awarded the Nynorsk Literature Prize in 2005, for the novel Ekko. He is co-editor of the magazine Ekfrase - Nordisk Tidsskrift for Visuell Kultur. Among his non-fiction works are Zaprudered : the Kennedy Assassination Film in Visual Culture from 2011, and Den dokumentariske teikneserien from 2014.

References

1972 births
Living people
People from Haram, Norway
Norwegian male novelists
Norwegian magazine editors
21st-century Norwegian novelists
21st-century Norwegian male writers